Error in Evolution is the second album by Swedish death/thrash metal band One Man Army and the Undead Quartet.

Track listing
 "Mine for the Taking" – 3:53 (Mikael Lagerblad, Johan Linstrand)
 "Knights in Satan's Service" – 3:14 (Lagerblad, Linstrand)
 "Such A Sick Boy" – 3:59 (Linstrand)
 "The Supreme Butcher" – 2:57 (Lagerblad, Linstrand)
 "The Sun Never Shines: – 4:03 (Lagerblad, Linstrand)
 "See Them Burn" – 5:10  (Lindstrand, Pekka Kiviaho)
 "Nightmare in Ashes and Blood" – 4:52 (Lindstrand)
 "He's Back (The Man Behind the Mask)" – 3:45 (Alice Cooper, Kane Roberts, Thomas F. Kelly)
 "Heaven Knows No Pain" – 4:45 (Lindstrand, Liviaho)
 "Hail the King" – 3:15 (Lindstrand, Kiviaho)

Personnel
 Robert Axelsson - Bass
 Marek Dobrowolski - Drums
 Johan Lindstrand - Vocals
 Pekka Kiviaho - Rhythm Guitar
 Mikael Lagerblad - Lead Guitar
 Christian Älvestam - Additional vocals on "He's Back (The Man Behind the Mask)"

References

One Man Army and the Undead Quartet albums
2007 albums